Nauru competed at the 2004 Summer Olympics in Athens, Greece, from 13 to 29 August 2004.

Background

The Nauru Olympic Committee was recognized by the International Olympic Committee on 1 January 1994.

Weightlifting 

All three of Nauru's athletes at the Games were weightlifters, including 2002 Commonwealth champion Reanna Maricha Solomon. The best finish came from Peter, who beat out four other lifters to place 8th. Both male athletes were the youngest in their respective classes.

See also
 Nauru at the 2002 Commonwealth Games

References

External links
Official Report of the XXVIII Olympiad

Nations at the 2004 Summer Olympics
2004
2004 in Nauruan sport